The Colony High School (TCHS) is a public high school located in the city of The Colony, Texas, USA and classified as a 5A school by the UIL.  It is a part of the Lewisville Independent School District located in southeastern Denton County.   In 2015, the school was rated "Met Standard" by the Texas Education Agency.

History 
The Colony High School, located in The Colony, which opened in 1986 is part of Lewisville ISD.  Seniors of the 1987 class attended Lewisville High School as TCHS initially had only grades 9–11.

Academics 
The Colony High School offers a standard Texas high school curriculum as defined by the Texas State graduation requirements. In addition to those minimum requirements, The Colony High School also offers numerous College Board Advanced Placement (AP) courses that gives students the opportunity to qualify for college credit. Also a new addition to The Colony High School's academic help for the students is a program nationally known as AVID; Advancement Via Individual Determination which is a class for students who want to get into college. The class teaches them ways to take college level notes, self-discipline necessary for getting work done in college while giving them the opportunity to meet professionals in the field and allowing the students to go on field trips to college campuses. TCHS was the first high school in LISD to have the AVID program under the initial instruction of Jennifer Adams, Coach Dietzman, and this year's AVID teacher for the juniors and seniors; Reesa Wilkins. Recently, all LISD schools, including The Colony High School, entered into a partnership with local community colleges to offer students dual-credit summer courses that, if passed, qualifies as credit for both high school graduation and college.  In 2008/09 a new band hall, drum room, color guard room, and practice rooms were added.

Athletics 
The Colony Cougars compete in these sports:

Volleyball, Cross Country, Football, Basketball, Powerlifting, Wrestling, Swimming, Soccer, Golf, Tennis, Track, Cheerleading, Dance, Baseball & Softball

State titles
Girls Soccer 
2007(4A)
Theatre - UIL One Act Play State Champions 
2015 - "The Lost Boy"
2016 - 2nd Place - "In The Hands of its Enemy"
2017 - "Second Samuel"
Softball
2017(5A)

Feeder patterns
Elementary schools that feed into The Colony include 
 Camey
 Coyote Ridge
 Ethridge
 Hicks
 Morningside
 B.B. Owen
 Peter's Colony
 Stewart's Creek

Middle schools that feed into The Colony include:
 Griffin
 Lakeview
 Killian

Notable alumni 
 Ethan Rains, actor
 Dominic Rains, actor 
 Deron Williams, basketball player
 Mike Williams, American football player
 Bracey Wright, basketball player

See also 
Lewisville Independent School District
Edward S. Marcus High School
Flower Mound High School
Hebron High School
Lewisville High School

References

External links 
School website
TCHS Band Website

Lewisville Independent School District high schools
Educational institutions established in 1986
1986 establishments in Texas
School buildings completed in 1986